Khovrino may refer to:
Khovrino District, a district of Northern Administrative Okrug, Moscow, Russia
Khovrino (Moscow Metro), a station of the Moscow Metro

See also
Khovrino (rural locality), a list of rural localities in Russia